Boynguel Bamba is an arrondissement of Goudiry Department in Tambacounda Region in Senegal.

References 

Arrondissements of Senegal